Jomotsangkha Wildlife Sanctuary (formerly Khaling Wildlife Sanctuary) is the smallest protected area of Bhutan covering  in Samdrup Jongkhar District along the southern border with Assam. Khaling Wildlife Sanctuary is, despite its small acreage, an important habitat for elephants, gaur (Bos gaurus), and other tropical wildlife. It may also contain the rare pygmy hog (Porcula salvania) and hispid hare (Caprolagus hispidus) known to inhabit the adjacent Khaling Reserve in Assam, with which Khaling Wildlife Sanctuary forms a trans-border reserve.

See also
 List of protected areas of Bhutan

References

Wildlife sanctuaries of Bhutan
Protected areas of Bhutan
Samdrup Jongkhar District